Who Do You Love? is a 2008 film biopic of American record producer Leonard Chess (1917–1969). It was directed by Jerry Zaks and written by Peter Martin Wortmann and Robert Conte, and stars Alessandro Nivola as Chess. The cast also includes David Oyelowo as Muddy Waters.

The film was named after the Bo Diddley song "Who Do You Love?", which was co-produced by Leonard Chess. The film had the working title of Chess.

Location filming was in New Orleans.

Cast
Jon Abrahams – Phil Chess
Tim Bellow – Chuck Berry
Brett Beoubay – Bo Diddley's Manager
Robert Randolph – Bo Diddley
Rus Blackwell – Missouri Sheriff
Marcus Lyle Brown – Jess
Chris Burnett – Stage Manager
Joe Chrest – Malcolm Chisholm
Heather Clark – Waitress Deloris
Noell Coet – Frances
Joshua Davis – Terry Chess
Miko DeFoor – Little Walter
Marika Dominczyk – Revetta Chess
Dominique DuVernay – Core Swing Dancer
Thomas Elliott – Radio DJ
J. D. Evermore – Jake
Madeline Gaudet – Concert Fan
Lisa Goldstein – Sheva Chess
Russell M. Haeuser – Concert security guard
TJ Hassan – Lonnie Johnson
Brent Henry – Police Officer
Albert H. Bongard IV – Security Guard
Elise Kaywood – Dancer
Jeremy Evan Kerr – Assistant Stage Manager
Cynthia LeBlanc – Concert Fan
Elton LeBlanc – Security Guard
Ian Leson – Alan Freed
Naima Imani Lett – Chess Receptionist
Earl Maddox – Bar Owner
Tendal Mann – Marshall Chess
Roy McCrerey – Hank Lakin
Hunter McGregor – Petey
Crystal Morgan – Concert Fan
Alessandro Nivola – Leonard Chess
David Oyelowo – Muddy Waters
Logan Starlarow – Ethan

References

External links

Reviews of Who Do You Love? on Metacritic

American biographical drama films
Films set in the 1950s
American musical drama films
Biographical films about musicians
Films scored by Jeff Beal
Films shot in New Orleans
2008 films
Cultural depictions of blues musicians
2008 biographical drama films
2000s musical drama films
2008 drama films
2000s English-language films
2000s American films